The British Grand Prix 2011 is the men's edition of the 2011 British Grand Prix (squash), which is a PSA World Series event Gold (Prize money : 115 000 $). The event took place at the National Squash Centre in Manchester in England from 19 to 25 September. Ramy Ashour won his second British Grand Prix trophy, beating Nick Matthew in the final.

Prize money and ranking points
For 2011, the prize purse was $115,000. The prize money and points breakdown is as follows:

Seeds

Draw and results

See also
British Grand Prix (squash)
2011 Men's World Open Squash Championship
PSA World Tour 2011
PSA World Series

References

External links
PSA British Grand Prix 2011 website
British Grand Prix SquashSite website
British Grand Prix official website

Squash tournaments in the United Kingdom
Squash in England
Men's British Grand Prix
Men's British Grand Prix
2010s in Manchester
2011 in British sport
Sports competitions in Manchester
September 2011 sports events in the United Kingdom